Cyprian Bridge Island is a small island located among the Solomon Islands. The island lies at a latitude of -6.85S and a longitude of 156.18333E. It is an uninhabited volcanic island that lies between the islands of Fauro (about 11 km to the southwest) and Choiseul (a much larger island about 30 km to the east-northeast). The island lies within Choiseul Province.

Naming 
The island is named after Major Cyprian Bridge (1807-1885) who was a British army officer, particularly famed for his activities in the Flagstaff War, which was fought against the Māori in New Zealand in 1845. He was the uncle of Admiral Sir Cyprian Bridge (1839-1924) who was the head of British Naval Intelligence.

See also

 Desert island
 List of islands

References

Uninhabited islands of the Solomon Islands
Volcanoes of the Solomon Islands